Live in Boston (a.k.a. Boston Live and Jumping at Shadows) is a live album by British blues-rock band Fleetwood Mac that was first released in 1985.

Recording and release
The songs on the album were recorded over three nights at the Boston Tea Party venue in Boston, between 5 and 7 February 1970.  The recordings were made for a proposed live album which was to have been released during 1970. The project was shelved and the tapes remained unreleased, until Shanghai Records issued seven songs from the performances as Live in Boston in February 1985. 

The album was reissued a few months later as Jumping at Shadows by Varrick Records. A number of other releases, with titles such as Boston Live, Oh Well "Live" or Live, featuring the same track listing as the original Live in Boston album were released by various labels worldwide during the late 1980s and early 1990s. Shanghai followed Live in Boston with a 2-LP set titled Cerulean, which included additional material taken from the same concerts, and functioned as a second volume to the original release.

In 1998, Snapper Music released an expanded three-volume CD set, titled Live in Boston: Remastered (later reissued as Live at the Boston Tea Party), which collected most of the available tracks from the Boston Tea Party concerts.  These three volumes have subsequently been available individually or as a box set. All three volumes were reissued as a four LP set in 2003, under the title Live at the Boston Tea Party. In 2013, the set was repackaged as simply Boston, including new album art based on the band's 1970 tour poster and photographs of the band members' faces on each of five beer coasters.

Live in Boston (Shanghai, 1985) track listing

Side 1
"Oh Well" (Peter Green) – 3:36
"Like It This Way" (Danny Kirwan) – 4:18
"World in Harmony" (Kirwan, Green) – 3:46
"Only You" (Kirwan) – 4:26

Side 2
"Black Magic Woman" (Green) – 6:25
"Jumping at Shadows" (Duster Bennett) – 5:00
"Can't Hold On" (Elmore James) – 6:59

Live in Boston: Remastered (Snapper, 1998) track listing

Volume one
"Black Magic Woman" (Green) – 6:45
"Jumping at Shadows" (Bennett) – 4:48
"Like It This Way" (Kirwan) – 4:28
"Only You" (Kirwan) – 4:23
"Rattlesnake Shake (Green) – 24:38
"I Can't Hold Out" (James) – 6:35
"Got to Move" (James) – 3:25
"The Green Manalishi (With the Two-Prong Crown)" (Green) – 12:52

Volume two
"World in Harmony" (Kirwan, Green) – 4:10
"Oh Well" (Green) – 3:12
"Rattlesnake Shake" (Green) – 25:36
"Stranger Blues" (James, Marshall Sehorn) – 3:55
"Red Hot Mama" (James) – 4:03
"Teenage Darling" (Jeremy Spencer) - 4:16
"Keep A-Knocking" (Richard Wayne Penniman) – 4:56
"Jenny Jenny" (Enotris Johnson, Penniman) – 7:40
"Encore Jam" (Green, Kirwan, Spencer, Joe Walsh) – 13:25

Volume three
"Jumping at Shadows" (Bennett) – 4:17
"Sandy Mary" (Green) – 5:21
"If You Let Me Love You" (B. B. King) – 10:30
"Loving Kind" (Kirwan) – 2:57
"Coming Your Way" (Kirwan) – 7:06
"Madison Blues" (James) – 4:49
"Got to Move" (James) – 3:56
"The Sun Is Shining" (James) – 3:11
"Oh Baby" (James) – 4:26
"Tiger" (Ollie Jones) – 3:44
"Great Balls of Fire" (Jack Hammer, Otis Blackwell) – 3:16
"Tutti Frutti" (Joe Lubin, Penniman, Dorothy LaBostrie) – 6:45
"On We Jam" (Green, Kirwan, Spencer, John McVie, Mick Fleetwood) – 7:56

Personnel
Fleetwood Mac
Peter Green – guitar, vocals, six string bass on "Green Manalishi"
Jeremy Spencer – guitar, vocals, piano, percussion
Danny Kirwan – guitar, vocals
John McVie – bass guitar
Mick Fleetwood – percussion, drums
guests:
Eric Clapton and Joe Walsh – guitar on "Encore Jam"
Dale Peters (probably) and Jimmy Fox (probably) - guest in unknown capacity on "Encore Jam"

Production (3CD Snapper release)
Original mixes by Vic Maile, Andy Rose & Nick Reynolds
Remixed by Nick Watson at SRT Studios, St Ives, England, June 1998, assisted by Neil Slaven
Original sleeve by William Millar

References

1985 live albums
Fleetwood Mac live albums
1998 live albums